Honywood Community Science School is a secondary school in Coggeshall, Essex, England.

It was first opened in 1964 and became Honywood School catering for 11-16 year olds. The average on roll is around 1100 learners.

Tablet computers
In May 2011 the school announced that each pupil was to be given their own iPad 2 tablet to help with their studies, at the cost of £500,000. The school became a case study for Apple. It was reported in 2015, that police investigated ""inappropriate" Skype and Snapchat images" on the school iPads, with an incident of grooming occurring during lesson time on a school issued iPad. The school implemented a new upgrade protocol to prevent any further occurrences.

Expansion
In 2006 the school was able to develop six new Science classrooms from the specialist schools funding stream. This was supported by local business who also contributed towards the development costs. In 2010, the school developed a relationship with the local Scout and Guide organisations and built a community building for shared use with these local youth organisations. The building is used by the school as an Expressive Arts facility, with a dance studio. The Scouts and Guides are able to utilise the building during evenings and weekends for their groups to meet.

In 2014 the school submitted a proposal to rebuild the school on land entrusted to the Marks Hall Charitable Trust. Marks Hall would develop 26 acres of land to the north of Coggeshall, building 300 houses and developing a small industrial estate. Money from this development would be used to fund the school rebuild. The proposal proved controversial as it appeared to contravene the will of Thomas Phillips Price who had "[left] the whole of his Essex estate to the nation in the interest of agriculture, arboriculture and forestry", and "[t]here is little public evidence that the charity has considered fully other options to raise money", having made a small profit in 2013. The most recent Ofsted report made no recommendation for a rebuild. The application was rejected by Essex County Council "with concerns over its financial viability and the availability of primary school places needed for the new homes"

Location
Honywood is situated on Westfield Drive in Coggeshall. This is 6 miles from Braintree and 10 miles from Colchester. The A120 wraps around the estate in which it resides, except the south which connects to Kelvedon

References

Academies in Essex
Secondary schools in Essex
Coggeshall
Specialist science colleges in England